Zunar may refer to:

 Zulkiflee Anwar Haque, Malaysian cartoonist
 Zunnar, a belt won by Christians in Jerusalem
 Zonnar, a village in Iran